The following is a list of notable deaths in March 2013.

Entries for each day are listed alphabetically by surname. A typical entry lists information in the following sequence:
Name, age, country of citizenship and reason for notability, established cause of death, reference.

March 2013

1
Jewel Akens, 79, American R&B singer ("The Birds and the Bees"), complications from back surgery.
Janez Albreht, 87, Slovenian actor.
Campbell Armstrong, 69, Scottish author.
Chris Canavan, 84, British actor (Coronation Street).
W. Gene Corley, 77, American consulting engineer.
Helga Cranston, 91, German film editor.
Robert Danhof, 87, American judge, member (1969–1992) and Chief Judge (1976–1992) of the Michigan Court of Appeals.
Bonnie Franklin, 69, American actress (One Day at a Time, The Young and the Restless, Please Don't Eat the Daisies), pancreatic cancer.
Mukesh Gadhvi, 50, Indian politician, MP for Banaskantha, complications from a stroke.
Sammy Guillen, 88, Trinidadian-born New Zealand cricketer, represented both countries.
D. V. J. Harischandra, 74, Sri Lankan psychiatrist and Buddhist scholar, complications from a heart attack.
Margaret Johansen, 89, Norwegian novelist.
Gaynelle Griffin Jones, 64, American lawyer and judge, US Attorney for the Southern District of Texas, member of the Texas Court of Appeals, cancer.
Pat Keen, 79, English actress (Fawlty Towers, Shadowlands).
Naw Kham, 43, Burmese drug lord, execution by lethal injection.
Magic, 37, American rap vocalist (Sky's the Limit), traffic collision.
Ric Menello, 60, American writer (Two Lovers), music video director ((You Gotta) Fight for Your Right (To Party!)), heart attack.
John Paul Miller, 94, American goldsmith.
Trevor Morley, 79, English cricketer.
Erich Pennekamp, 83, German Olympic water polo player.
Rafael Puyana, 81, Colombian harpsichordist.
Sir Alan Smith, 95, British World War II Spitfire fighter ace.
Ken Stanley, 91, English table tennis player.
Gabriel Vanel, 88, French Roman Catholic prelate, Archbishop of Auch (1985–1996).
Ludwig Zausinger, 84, German footballer.

2
Phillip Bonosky, 96, American novelist and journalist.
Tom Borland, 80, American baseball player (Boston Red Sox), MVP of the College World Series (1955).
Francesca Forrellad, 85, Spanish writer, aneurysm.
Walther Gerhold, 91, German Marine-Schreiber-Obergefreiter in the Kriegsmarine during World War II.
Peter Harvey, 68, Australian television journalist (Nine Network), pancreatic cancer.
William F. Hyland, 89, American politician and lawyer, New Jersey Attorney General (1974–1978).
Jimmy Jackson, 81, Scottish footballer (Notts County).
Eriya Kategaya, 67, Ugandan politician, Deputy Prime Minister and Minister for East African Affairs.
Giorgos Kolokithas, 67, Greek basketball player, cardiac arrest.
Thomas McEvilley, 73, American art critic and academic, complications from cancer.
Master O'Reilly, 10, New Zealand-bred Australian racehorse, winner of Caulfield Cup (2007).
Bryce Rope, 90, New Zealand All Blacks rugby union coach (1983–1984).
Hans Schnitger, 97, Dutch Olympic bronze-medalist field hockey player (1936).
Shabnam Shakeel, 70, Pakistani poet and author.
Bjørn Skau, 84, Norwegian politician, Minister of Justice and the Police (1981).
Jorge Vago, 85, Argentine Olympic sailor.
Zdeněk Švestka, 87, Czech astronomer.

3
Zora Kramer Brown, 63, American breast cancer awareness advocate, ovarian cancer.
Luis Cubilla, 72, Uruguayan footballer (River Plate, Nacional), stomach cancer.
Rik De Saedeleer, 89, Belgian football player (KV Mechelen) and journalist.
Johann Eekhoff, 71, German economist.
Col Firmin, 72, Australian politician.
Jaime Guadalupe González Domínguez, 38, Mexican journalist, shot.
Plamen Goranov, 36, Bulgarian rights activist, self-immolation.
Müslüm Gürses, 59, Turkish singer and actor, complications from heart surgery.
Johnny Hanks, 78, New Zealand boxer.
Junior Heffernan, 23, Irish triathlete and racing cyclist, race collision.
Gerald D. Klee, 86, American psychiatrist and LSD expert, involved in hallucinogenic drug research for US Army, complications following surgery.
Manfred Kremser, 62, Austrian ethnologist.
Danie G. Krige, 93, South African mining engineer and geologist.
Richard Matthews, 60, South African Emmy- and BAFTA Award-winning wildlife filmmaker (BBC Natural History Unit), plane crash.
Bobby Rogers, 73, American soul singer and songwriter (The Miracles), complications from diabetes.
José Sancho, 68, Spanish actor, lung cancer.
Song Wenfei, 27, Chinese actress, uterine cancer.
James Strong, 68, Australian businessman, CEO of Qantas (1993–2001), complications from lung surgery.
George Wearring, 84, Canadian Olympic basketball player (1952).
Donald W. Zacharias, 77, American academic, President of MSU (1985–1997).

4
José Almandoz, 75, Spanish Olympic rower.
Lillian Cahn, 89, American businesswoman, co-founder of Coach, Inc. and designer of the Coach handbag
Bill Dankbaar, 60, Australian Olympic rower.
Menachem Froman, 67, Israeli settler and chief rabbi, colorectal cancer.
Dic Goodman, 93, Welsh poet.
Harry Greene, 89, Welsh actor and television personality, creator of Changing Rooms and DIY SOS.
Chick Halbert, 94, American basketball player.
Seki Matsunaga, 84, Japanese footballer.
Mickey Moore, 98, Canadian-born American actor and director, heart failure.
Maurus Nekaro, 57, Namibian politician, Governor of Kavango Region (since 2010), hypertension.
Tom Pennington, 73, American football player (Georgia Bulldogs, Dallas Texans).
George Petherbridge, 85, English footballer (Bristol Rovers).
Jérôme Savary, 70, Argentine-born French theater director and actor, cancer.
Hobart Muir Smith, 100, American herpetologist.
Toren Smith, 52, Canadian manga publisher and translator.
Fran Warren, 87, American singer ("Sunday Kind of Love") and actress (Abbott and Costello Meet Captain Kidd).

5
Paul Bearer, 58, American professional wrestling manager, upper respiratory infection.
Hugo Chávez, 58, Venezuelan politician and military officer, President (since 1999), heart attack.
Stephen Citron, 89, American composer and biographer.
Nigel Forbes, 22nd Lord Forbes, 95, Scottish soldier, businessman and politician, Minister of State for Scotland (1958–1959).
Calvin Fowler, 73, American Olympic gold medallist basketball player (1968).
Charles Galbreath, 87, American politician and judge, member of the Tennessee House (1960–1968) and Court of Appeals (1968–1978), pneumonia.
Duane Gish, 92, American creationist.
Gorō Naya, 83, Japanese voice actor (Lupin III, Kamen Rider, Space Battleship Yamato), chronic respiratory failure.
Dawn Clark Netsch, 86, American politician, member of the Illinois State Senate (1972–1990), Illinois Comptroller (1991–1995), amyotrophic lateral sclerosis.
Dieter Pfaff, 65, German actor, lung cancer.
Rajasulochana, 77, Indian actress and dancer, renal failure.
Robert Relyea, 82, American film producer (West Side Story, Bullitt), natural causes.
Melvin Rhyne, 76, American jazz organist.
Hikmat al-Shihabi, 82, Syrian military leader.
Tommy Smith, 75, American jockey.
Arthur Storch, 87, American theatrical director and actor, founder of Syracuse Stage.
Luc Wallays, 51, Belgian cyclist, cancer.
Tove Wallenstrøm, 98, Danish actress.
Bill Walters, 69, American politician, member of the Arkansas Senate (1982–2000), pancreatic cancer.

6
Maciej Berbeka, 58, Polish mountaineer, climbing accident.
Dave Bewley, 92, English footballer (Watford).
Sabine Bischoff, 54, German Olympic champion fencer (1984).
Chorão, 42, Brazilian singer-songwriter (Charlie Brown Jr.), skateboarder and screenwriter, cocaine overdose.
Ahmed Zaman Chowdhury, 65, Bangladeshi film journalist, screenwriter and lyricist, road accident.
W. Wallace Cleland, 83, American biochemist.
Stompin' Tom Connors, 77, Canadian country-folk singer ("The Hockey Song", "Bud the Spud"), kidney failure.
Ward de Ravet, 88, Belgian actor.
Keld Helmer-Petersen, 92, Danish art photographer.
Takashi Iwashige, 58, Japanese manga artist.
Abdul Jalil, 74, Bangladeshi politician, MP for Naogaon District.
Sir Norman King, 79, British vice admiral and naval secretary.
Alvin Lee, 68, British guitarist (Ten Years After), complications from surgery.
Carlo Lotti, 96, Italian engineer.
Jack Marshall, Australian rugby player.
Paddy McIlvenny, 88, Northern Irish footballer.
Andrei Panin, 50, Russian actor.
John Spence, 83, Saint Vincent-born Trinidadian politician and botanist, member of the Trinidad Senate (1987–2000), heart attack.
Roland Trebicka, 65, Albanian actor, lung cancer.
Bernarda Vásquez Méndez, 95, Costa Rican suffragist, first country's female to vote.
Mike Walker, 101, American engineer.

7
Kenny Ball, 82, English jazz trumpeter, pneumonia.
Peter Banks, 65, English rock guitarist (Yes), heart failure.
Cleto Bellucci, 91, Italian Roman Catholic prelate, Archbishop of Fermo (1976–1997).
Ruth Booker-Bryant, 89, American human rights activist.
John J. Byrne, 81, American insurance executive, Chairman of White Mountains Insurance Group (GEICO, Overstock.com), cancer.
Sybil Christopher, 83, Welsh actress.
Dirk Coetzee, 67, South African paramilitary commander (Vlakplaas), kidney failure.
Didier Comès, 70, Belgian comedic artist.
Beatriz Consuelo, 80, Brazilian-born Swiss ballerina and dance instructor.
Damiano Damiani, 90, Italian film director (Amityville II: The Possession).
Max Ferguson, 89, British-born Canadian radio broadcaster, heart attack.
Barbara Goldschmidt, 91-92, Israeli painter.
Dick Graham, 90, British football manager (Colchester United F.C.), heart condition.
Harold Hunter, 86, American basketball coach (Tennessee State University), first African-American to sign NBA contract.
Frederick B. Karl, 88, American judge and politician, member of Florida House of Representatives (1956–1964), Senate (1968–1972) and Florida Supreme Court (1976–1978).
Stan Keery, 81, English footballer (Crewe Alexandra).
Claude King, 90, American country music singer ("Wolverton Mountain").
Freda Linde, 97, South African children's writer and translator.
Ray Martin, 87, American baseball player (Boston Braves).
Willie McCulloch, 85, Scottish footballer.
Els Noordhof, 89, Dutch artist.
Ali Al Numairy, 55, Emirati plastic surgeon, traffic accident.
Alfred Post, 86, German Olympic footballer (1952).
Pao Sarasin, 83, Thai politician, Deputy Prime Minister (1992), Interior Minister (1992), blood infection.
Jeffrey Skitch, 85, British opera singer and educator.
Jake Striker, 79, American baseball player (Cleveland Indians, Chicago White Sox).
Willy Switkes, 83, American character actor (Tootsie), colon cancer.
Elmar Tampõld, 92, Estonian-born Canadian architect.
Carl Thomas, 80, American baseball player (Cleveland Indians).
Jacques Torczyner, 98, Belgian political leader, President of the ZOA (1968–1973).
Jan Zwartkruis, 87, Dutch football coach (national team).

8
Haseeb Ahsan, 73, Pakistani cricketer.
Rolando Bojórquez Gutiérrez, 45, Mexican politician.
Hartmut Briesenick, 63, German Olympic bronze medallist shot put athlete (1972).
Hardin Cox, 85, American politician, member of the Missouri House of Representatives (1965–1975) and Missouri Senate (1975–1983).
Ricardo da Force, 45, English dance vocalist (The KLF, N-Trance), brain hemorrhage.
Toby Graham, 92, British Olympic (1956) cross-country skier and university professor.
Hakob Hakobian, 89, Armenian artist, heart attack.
Carlos Jauregui, 80, Chilean–Canadian chess master.
Ewald-Heinrich von Kleist-Schmenzin, 90, German Army officer and publisher, last surviving member of the 20 July plot.
Jürg Marmet, 85, Swiss mountaineer, third person to summit Mount Everest (1956).
Enda Marren, 78, Irish lawyer.
Sammy Masters, 82, American rockabilly musician.
Tony Maxworthy, 79, British-American physicist.
John O'Connell, 86, Irish politician, TD for Dublin South-West (1965–1993), Minister for Health (1992–1993) and MEP for European Parliament (1979–1981).
Kai Pahlman, 77, Finnish footballer.
George Saimes, 71, American football player (Buffalo Bills, Denver Broncos), leukemia.
Rudolf Schiffl, 71, German Olympic archer.
Charles Thurstan Shaw, 98, British archaeologist.
Raymond Telles, 97, American politician and diplomat, Mayor of El Paso (1957–1961), Ambassador to Costa Rica (1961–1967).
Ian Wilson, 80, Irish cricketer.
Ginny Wood, 95, American environmentalist, founder of the Alaska Conservation Society.

9
Aasia, 60, Pakistani film actress.
Tengiz Amirejibi, 85, Georgian pianist.
Angelo J. Arculeo, 89, American politician.
Dave Bland, 83, Australian rules footballer.
Geoff Braybrooke, 77, British-born New Zealand politician, MP for Napier (1981–2002).
David Farmbrough, 83, British Anglican prelate, Bishop of Bedford (1981–1993).
David Handley, 81, British Olympic cyclist (1960).
Max Jakobson, 89, Finnish diplomat and journalist.
Larry Martin, 69, American paleontologist, cancer.
Richard McIver, 71, American politician.
Paul Nassau, 83, American composer and lyricist.
Neneco Norton, 89, Paraguayan musician, composer and orchestra director.
Viren J. Shah, 86, Indian politician and industrialist, Governor of West Bengal (1999–2004), heart attack.
A. R. Shaw, 91, American politician, member of the North Dakota House of Representatives.
Merton Simpson, 84, American artist, gallery owner and African art collector, complications from stroke, diabetes and dementia.

10
Larisa Avdeyeva, 87, Russian mezzo-soprano.
Edelmiro Amante, 79, Filipino politician, member of the House of Representatives (1987–1995, 2001–2004, 2007–2010), liver cancer.
Jim Anderson, 82, Canadian ice hockey player (Springfield Indians) and coach (Washington Capitals).
Brian Archer, 83, Australian politician, Senator for Tasmania (1975–1994).
Hugh Casey, 85, Northern Irish politician.
John Chick, 80, Australian football player (Carlton).
Robert Chrisman, 75, American poet, activist and editor (The Black Scholar), complications from heart failure.
Stanley Crowther, 87, British politician, MP for Rotherham (1976–1992).
Maurice Delarue, 93, French journalist.
Jacques Dupont, 91, French film director (Trapped by Fear).
Emilio Eiroa, 77, Spanish politician, President of the Government of Aragon (1991–1993).
Wolf Gorelik, 80, Russian conductor.
František Gregor, 74, Czech Olympic ice hockey player.
*Princess Lilian, Duchess of Halland, 97, Welsh-born Swedish royal.
Tony Mansfield, 73, Irish hurling player and manager.
Antal Megyerdi, 73, Hungarian Olympic cyclist.
Ian Munro Ross, 85, British engineer and scientist, President of Bell Labs (1979–1991), pneumonia.
Frank Ruddle, 83, American cell and developmental biologist.
Metin Serezli, 79, Turkish actor, lung cancer.
Adalin Wichman, 91, American sculptor, designer of the Eclipse Award Trophy.
Masao Yamaguchi, 81, Japanese anthropologist, pneumonia.
Asa G. Yancey, Sr., 96, American physician and academic. 
Danny Zialcita, 72, Filipino filmmaker, stroke.

11
Erica Andrews, 43, Mexican drag performer, Miss Continental (2004), lung ailment.
Helga Arendt, 48, German Olympic sprinter (1988).
Martin Adolf Bormann, 82, German theologian.
Paul Brasack, 96, German U-boat commander during World War II and Iron Cross recipient.
Ignatius Anthony Catanello, 74, American Roman Catholic prelate, Auxiliary Bishop of Brooklyn (1994–2010).
Doug Christie, 66, Canadian lawyer and free speech activist, leader of the Western Block Party (since 2005), liver cancer.
Simón Alberto Consalvi, 85, Venezuelan politician and author, Minister of Foreign Affairs (1977–1979; 1985–1988), Minister of Interior and Justice (1988–1989).
Tony Gubba, 69, British journalist and sports commentator, leukaemia.
Raymond Kirsch, 71, Luxembourgian businessman and politician, President of the Council of State (2000–2001).
Lisa Lynch, 33, British journalist, breast cancer.
Maya Ray, 86, Indian politician, kidney failure.
Mitchell Melton, 69, American politician, member of the Pennsylvania House of Representatives (1969–1972), prostate cancer.
Ramankutty Nair, 87, Indian Kathakali maestro, recipient of the Padma Bhushan.
Robert Pecanka, 82, Austrian Olympic hockey player.
Jacquelin Perry, 94, American orthopedic surgeon, known for her treatment of polio.
Sripada Pinakapani, 99, Indian musician.
Florian Siwicki, 88, Polish military officer and politician, Minister of Military Affairs (1981–1990).
Boris Vasilyev, 88, Russian writer.

12
John Boncore, 61, American political activist, fall.
George Burditt, 90, American politician and lawyer.
Clive Burr, 56, British drummer (Iron Maiden), complications from multiple sclerosis.
Robert Castel, 79, French sociologist.
Stanley Cole, 89, American architect (EwingCole), designed Citizens Bank Park, pneumonia.
Michael Grigsby, 76, British documentary film maker.
John Holloway, 70, Australian public servant and diplomat, skin cancer and diabetes.
Kazzia, 13, German-foaled Irish thoroughbred horse, post-foaling complications. (death announced on this date)
Teresa Mattei, 92, Italian freedom fighter and politician, last female member of the Constituent Assembly, proposed mimosa as symbol of IWD.
George A. Norris, 84, Canadian artist and sculptor.
Gordon Pembery, 86, Welsh footballer. 
Ray Perez, 74, American Olympic boxer.
Ganesh Pyne, 76, Indian painter, cardiac arrest.

13
José Guadalupe Cervantes Corona, 88, Mexican politician, Governor of Zacatecas (1980–1986).
Philip Crosfield, 88, Scottish Anglican priest.
Richard Davey, 74, Australian actor and playwright.
Léon Deladerrière, 85, French football player and coach.
Cartha DeLoach, 92, American FBI agent and author.
Ducky Detweiler, 94, American baseball player (Boston Braves).
Werner Hofmann, 84, Austrian art historian, cultural journalist, writer, curator and museum director, heart attack.
Sir Tore Lokoloko, 82, Papua New Guinean politician, Governor-General (1977–1983).
Jack Marston, 64, English rugby league player, cancer.
Delia Meulenkamp, 77, Dutch-born American Olympic swimmer (1952).
Veer Bhadra Mishra, 74, Indian mahant and environmentalist, Time magazine "Hero of the Planet" (1999), lung infection.
Hans Moretti, 84, German illusionist and escapologist.
Gerard Sithunywa Ndlovu, 74, South African Roman Catholic prelate, Bishop of Umzimkulu (1986–1994).
Nelson Ne'e, 59, Solomon Islands politician, MP for Central Honiara (2006–2010).
Perween Rahman, 56, Pakistani activist, director of the Orangi Pilot Project, homicide.
Rolf Schult, 85, German voice actor.
Władysław Stachurski, 67, Polish football player and manager (Legia Warsaw, national team).
Malachi Throne, 84, American actor (It Takes a Thief, Star Trek, Catch Me If You Can), lung cancer.
Siegfried Weiß, 79, German Olympic skier.
Paul H. Wendler, 96, American politician.

14
William Sheridan Allen, 80, American historian.
Jim Barrett, 86, American wine pioneer and vineyard owner (Chateau Montelena).
Henry Besant, 40, English mixologist and businessman, heart attack.
Edward Bland, 86, American filmmaker and composer (The Cry of Jazz).
Walt Buck, 82, Canadian politician, Alberta MLA for Clover Bar (1967–1989), stomach cancer.
Stanford Cazier, 82, American educator, president of California State University, Chico (1971–1979) and Utah State University (1979–1992).
Norman Collier, 87, British comedian, Parkinson's disease.
Jack Curran, 82, American high school sports coach, complications from cancer and kidney failure.
Jack Greene, 83, American country music singer ("Statue of a Fool", "There Goes My Everything"), complications from Alzheimer's disease.
Subas Herrero, 69, Filipino comedian, respiratory failure.
Mirja Hietamies, 82, Finnish Olympic medal-winning (1952, 1956) cross-country skier.
Scott Kennedy, 47, American comedian.
John Konstantinos, 76, American football coach and administrator.
Harry Coleman McGehee, Jr., 89, American Episcopalian prelate, Bishop of Michigan (1973–1990).
François Narmon, 79, Belgian businessman and sports administrator.
Thomas Rhoad, Jr., 89, American politician, member of the South Carolina House of Representatives (1983–2007).
Paul Rose, 69, Canadian political figure, leader of PDS (1996–2002), convicted kidnapper and murderer (October Crisis), stroke.
Aramais Sahakyan, 76, Armenian writer and politician.
Ieng Sary, 87, Vietnamese-born Cambodian politician, co-founder of the Khmer Rouge.
George Sossenko, 94, Russian military veteran (Spanish Civil War).
Harry Thomson, 72, Scottish footballer (Burnley F.C.), throat cancer.
Camilo Vives, 71, Cuban film producer (Lucía, Fresa y Chocolate).

15
P Balasubramaniam, 53, Malaysian private investigator, alleged government conspiracy in the murder of Shaariibuugiin Altantuyaa, heart attack.
James Bonk, 82, American chemistry professor.
Bernard Cheese, 88, British painter and printmaker.
Docs Keepin Time, 25-26, American Quarter Horse.
Booth Gardner, 76, American politician, Governor of Washington (1985–1993), Parkinson's disease.
Hardrock Gunter, 88, American musician, complications of pneumonia.
Shannon Larratt, 39, Canadian editor and publisher (BMEzine).
Terry Lightfoot, 77, British jazz clarinettist.
Leverne McDonnell, 49, Australian actress (The Saddle Club, Phoenix), cancer.
Masamichi Noro, 78, Japanese aikidoka, founded Kinomichi.
Kallam Anji Reddy, 74, Indian chemical engineer and pharmaceutical executive, founder of Dr. Reddy's Laboratories, liver cancer.
Dante Rossi, 76, Italian Olympic water polo player.
Jack Stevens, 83, Australian footballer.
Marcel van Cleemput, 86, French-born British toy designer.
Peter Worsley, 88, British sociologist.
Felipe Zetter, 89, Mexican footballer (Club Atlas, national team).

16
Trond Brænne, 59, Norwegian actor and author, stroke.
Larcenia Bullard, 65, American politician, member of the Florida House of Representatives (1992–2000) and Senate (2002–2012).
Leslie Gooday, 91, British architect.
Jamal Nazrul Islam, 74, Bangladeshi mathematical physicist and cosmologist, diabetes and heart disease.
*Kong Ngai, 77, Chinese film and television actor (The Greed of Man), lung cancer.
Luchaa Mohamed Lamin, 60, Saharawi politician and diplomat, lung cancer.
Elizabeth Lindsay, 100, American track and field athlete.
José Alfredo Martínez de Hoz, 87, Argentine economist, Minister of Economy (1976–1981).
John Marvel, 86, American politician, member of the Nevada Assembly (1979–2005), lung disease.
David Mills, 75, English cricketer.
Jason Molina, 39, American singer-songwriter, multiple organ failure.
Yadier Pedroso, 26, Cuban baseball player, traffic collision.
Sol Rabinowitz, 88, American recording industry executive (Baton Records). 
Michael Roarty, 84, American brewing advertising executive (Anheuser-Busch), created "This Bud's for you" slogan.
Ruchoma Shain, 98, American-born teacher and author.
Bobby Smith, 76, American singer (The Spinners), complications of influenza and pneumonia.
Marina Solodkin, 60, Russian-born Israeli politician, Member of Knesset (1996–2013), stroke.
Jae Spears, 90, American politician, member of the West Virginia House of Delegates (1974–1980) and West Virginia Senate (1980–1992).
Frank Thornton, 92, British actor (Are You Being Served?, Last of the Summer Wine, Gosford Park).

17
Blaster Al Ackerman, 73, American writer and artist.
Rudolf Battěk, 88, Czech sociologist, dissident and politician, recipient of the Order of Tomáš Garrigue Masaryk.
Svein Blindheim, 96, Norwegian military officer, World War II resistance fighter and historian.
William B. Caldwell, III, 87, American military officer, Commander General for the Fifth Army.
Grady Clay, 96, American journalist and landscape architect.
Steve Davis, 60, American college football player (University of Oklahoma), plane crash.
Rosine Delamare, 101, French costume designer (The Earrings of Madame de...).
André Fontaine, 91, French historian and journalist.
Lawrence Fuchs, 86, American academic.
Mitchell Hooks, 89, American artist, illustrator, and movie poster artist (Dr. No, The Sand Pebbles, El Dorado).
Jan van Houwelingen, 73, Dutch politician, State Secretary for Defence (1981–1989), Mayor of Haarlemmermeer (1994–2003).
Jean-Noël Lavoie, 85, Canadian politician.
John David Merwin, 91, American politician, Governor of the Virgin Islands (1958–1961).
Olivier Metzner, 63, French criminal lawyer, apparent suicide.
Akio Johnson Mutek, 55, South Sudanese Roman Catholic prelate, Bishop of Torit (since 2007), kidney failure.
Umm Nidal, 63, Palestinian politician, multiple organ failure.
Peter Scott, 82, British burglar.
François Sermon, 89, Belgian footballer (R.S.C. Anderlecht).
A.B.C. Whipple, 94, American journalist and author.

18
Muhammad Mahmood Alam, 77, Pakistani military officer, General and flying ace (Indo-Pakistani War of 1965).
Mindy Baha El Din, 54, Egyptian environmentalist, complications from a stroke.
Henry Bromell, 65, American screenwriter and producer (Homeland, Chicago Hope, Northern Exposure), heart attack.
Clay Ford, 74, American politician, member of the Florida House of Representatives (since 2007), cancer.
Earl Hersh, 80, American baseball player (Milwaukee Braves).
Ali İhsan Karayiğit, 85-86, Turkish football player.
Muhammad Khan, 84, Pakistani Olympic boxer.
Mary Ellen Rudin, 88, American mathematician.
Robin Williams, 93, New Zealand mathematician, university administrator and civil servant, member of the Manhattan Project.

19
Khalid Ahmad, 69, Pakistani poet and journalist, lung cancer.
Ryan Birch, 43, British judoka, traffic collision.
Tom Clements, 58, American civil servant, head of the Colorado Department of Corrections (since 2011), shot.
Desmond Drummer, 72, South African cricketer.
Eyvind Fjeld Halvorsen, 90, Norwegian academic.
Holger Juul Hansen, 88, Danish actor.
Lester Lewis, 46, American television writer and producer (The Office, Caroline in the City, The PJs), suicide.
Valentino Macchi, 75,  Italian actor.
Lori March, 90, American television actress.
Sir Fergus Montgomery, 85, British politician, MP for Newcastle upon Tyne East (1959–1964), Brierley Hill (1967–1974), and Altrincham and Sale (1974–1997).
Seijin Noborikawa, 80, Japanese folk musician.
Bud Palmer, 91, American sportscaster and basketball player (New York Knicks), cancer.
David Parland, 42, Swedish musician (Dark Funeral), suicide.
Irina Petrescu, 71, Romanian actress, cancer.
Harry Reems, 65, American porn actor (Deep Throat), pancreatic cancer.
Adeline Smith, 95, American Lower Elwha Klallam Tribe elder, developed the Klallam language alphabet and first dictionary.

20
George Barrow, 91, American jazz saxophonist.
Eddie Bond, 79, American rockabilly singer, complications from Alzheimer's disease.
Rena Golden, 51, Indian-born American journalist (CNN, The Weather Channel), lymphoma.
James Herbert, 69, English horror writer (The Rats).
Vasile Ianul, 67, Romanian football player and executive, Chairman of Dinamo Bucharest (1985–1994), cardiac arrest.
Robert W. Johnson, 88, American politician, member of the Minnesota House of Representatives (1963–1975).
George Lowe, 89, New Zealand-born British mountaineer, explorer and film director, last participant of the 1953 British Mount Everest Expedition.
Vijay A. Madgavkar, 98, Indian badminton player.
Antonio Manganelli, 62, Italian police chief, head of Polizia di Stato (since 2007), complications of cancer.
Frederic Mayer, 81, American operatic tenor.
Leslie Milnes, 90, New Zealand cricketer.
Nicholas C. Petris, 90, American politician, member of the California State Assembly (1958–1966); State Senator (1966–1996), Alzheimer's disease.
Zillur Rahman, 84, Bangladeshi politician, President (since 2009).
Jesse Rogers, 79, American baseball player (Kansas City Monarchs).
Emílio Santiago, 66, Brazilian singer, complications from a stroke.
Stefano Simoncelli, 66, Italian Olympic medal-winning (1976) fencer.
Nasser El Sonbaty, 47, German professional bodybuilder.
Risë Stevens, 99, American operatic mezzo-soprano.
Jack Stokes, 92, English animation director (Yellow Submarine, Heavy Metal).
Calvert Watkins, 80, American Indo-European linguist, Harvard professor and author.
Jerry E. Wilkerson, 68, American politician, member of the Mississippi House of Representatives.

21
Chinua Achebe, 82, Nigerian poet, professor and novelist (Things Fall Apart, Anthills of the Savannah).
Terry Alderete, 67, American businesswoman, cardiac arrest.
Joseph Blewett, 87, South African cricketer.
Mohamed Said Ramadan Al-Bouti, 83, Turkish-born Syrian cleric, bombing.
Angus Carmichael, 87, Scottish footballer.
Ernest Chapman, 86, Australian Olympic rower.
Jim Crowley, 82-83,  American football coach.
Isagani Cruz, 88, Filipino judge, member of the Supreme Court (1986–1994).
Yvan Ducharme, 75, Canadian humorist and actor, COPD.
David Fisher, 66, English artist, cancer.
Tyrone Gilks, 19, Australian motorcycle stunt rider, collision during practice.
Rick Hautala, 64, American horror author, heart attack.
Harlon Hill, 80, American football player (Chicago Bears), namesake of Harlon Hill Trophy, MVP (1955), Rookie of the Year (1954).
Angelo Ingrassia, 89, American judge, member of the New York Supreme Court (1982–1999).
Sir Ewan Jamieson, 82, New Zealand military officer, Chief of Air Force (1979–1983), Chief of Defence Force (1983–1986).
Cornelis H. A. Koster, 69, Dutch computer scientist, traffic collision.
Ludwig Leitner, 73, German Olympic (1964) alpine skier and world champion .
Pietro Mennea, 60, Italian Olympic medal-winning (1972, 1980) sprinter and politician, cancer.
Moondog Spike, 62, American wrestler.
Robert Nichols, 88, American character actor (Giant).
Jörgen Ohlin, 75, Swedish footballer (Malmö FF).
Max Oldmeadow, 88, Australian politician, MP for Holt (1972–1975).
Aníbal Paz, 95, Uruguayan footballer.
Herschel Schacter, 95, American rabbi, natural causes.
Joe B. Scott, 92, American baseball player, stroke.
Bruce Skeggs, 80, Australian politician and trotting commentator.
Ken Wellman, 82, Australian ice hockey player.
Giancarlo Zagni, 86, Italian director and screenwriter (La bellezza di Ippolita).

22
John U. Bascom, 87, American surgeon.
Vladimír Čech, 61, Czech actor, television presenter and politician, colorectal cancer and pneumonia.
Leszek Gondek, 74, Polish historian.
Bernard Green, 60, British priest and historian, heart attack.
Fred Jones, 75, English football player (Hereford United, Brighton).
Jimmy Lloyd, 73, English Olympic boxer, heart attack.
James Nabrit III, 80, American civil rights lawyer, lung cancer.
Thomas Qian Yurong, 99, Chinese Roman Catholic prelate, Bishop of Xuzhou, ex-communicated then reconciled (2007).
Lee Scarpetti, 85, Italian-born American politician, member of the Connecticut Senate (1984–2000).
Christa Speck, 70, German model, Playboy Playmate (September 1961), Playmate of the Year (1962), natural causes.
Bebo Valdés, 94, Cuban pianist, bandleader, composer and arranger, Alzheimer's disease.
Robert D. Warren, Sr., 84, American politician, member of the West Virginia Senate (1980–1988).
Derek Watkins, 68, British trumpeter, played on every James Bond soundtrack, cancer.
Ray Williams, 58, American basketball player (New York Knicks), colon cancer.

23
Sukhraj Aujla, 45, Indian folk singer, traffic collision.
Boris Berezovsky, 67, Russian business oligarch, government official and mathematician, coroner's open verdict.
David Bond, 90, British Olympic champion sailor (1948).
Muhammad Chudori, 86, Indonesian journalist, co-founder of The Jakarta Post.
Jean Crawford Cochrane, 98, Irish educator.
Onofre Corpuz, 86, Filipino academic and politician, Secretary of Education (1967–1971, 1979–1984).
David Early, 74, American actor (Dawn of the Dead, The Silence of the Lambs, Zack and Miri Make a Porno), cancer.
Conrad Hyers, 79, American historian of religion.
Rapama Kamehozu, 63, Namibian politician, Governor of Omaheke (since 2012), Governor of Otjozondjupa (2011–2012), cancer.
Ruth A. Lucas, 92, first African American woman in the Air Force, cardiac arrest.
Norman R. Palmer, 94, American film and television editor (The Shaggy D.A., Ten Who Dared), natural causes.
Peter Sutton, 89, New Zealand Anglican clergyman, Bishop of Nelson (1965–1990).
Chandramani Tripathi, 66, Indian politician.
Virgil Trucks, 95, American baseball player (Detroit Tigers).
Joe Weider, 93, Canadian publisher, co-founder of the International Federation of BodyBuilders, founder of Muscle & Fitness, heart ailment.

24
Barbara Anderson, 86, New Zealand author.
Jo Inge Bjørnebye, 66, Norwegian Olympic ski jumper, cancer.
Walt Bodine, 92, American broadcaster.
Todd Breitenstein, 47, American game designer (Zombies!!!).
Harold Burns, 86, American politician, member (1972–2000) and Speaker of the New Hampshire House (1991–1996), Senate (2000–2002), throat cancer.
Čestmír Císař, 93, Czech politician, Chairman of the National Council (1968–1969).
Bob Colston, 84, British sports broadcaster, heart failure.
Mariana Drăgescu, 100, Romanian military pilot, natural causes.
Peter Duryea, 73, American actor (Star Trek, Bewitched, The Fugitive).
Mary Gillham, 91, English naturalist.
Hayden Griffin, 70, British scenic designer, cancer.
Derek Leaver, 82, English footballer (Blackburn Rovers).
Inge Lønning, 75, Norwegian theologian, educator, and politician.
Gury Marchuk, 87, Russian scientist.
Gerald Marwell, 76,  American sociologist, social psychologist and behavioral economist.
Walker David Miller, 73, American senior judge, United States District Court for the District of Colorado (1996–2011).
Paolo Ponzo, 41, Italian footballer, heart attack.
Sir Joseph Pope, 98, British engineer and academic administrator.
Ratón, 11, Spanish fighting bull.
Deke Richards, 68, American Motown songwriter ("ABC", "Mama's Pearl", "Maybe Tomorrow"), esophageal cancer.
Mohamed Yousri Salama, 38, Egyptian political leader, stomach infection.
Francis Cumming-Bruce, 8th Baron Thurlow, 101, British diplomat, Governor and Commander-in-Chief of the Bahamas (1968–1972).
Jessica Upshaw, 53, American politician, member of the Mississippi House of Representatives (since 2004), shot.

25
Léonce Bernard, 69, Canadian politician, Lieutenant Governor of Prince Edward Island (2001–2006).
Ellen Einan, 81, Norwegian poet.
Wayne Fleming, 62, Canadian ice hockey coach (Philadelphia Flyers), brain cancer.
Ben Goldfaden, 99, American basketball player (Washington Capitols).
Peter Hearn, 87, English cricketer (Kent).
Anthony Lewis, 85, American journalist (The New York Times), winner of Pulitzer Prize (1955, 1963), kidney and heart failure.
Dafydd Llywelyn, 74, Welsh composer, pianist, conductor and teacher.
Majid-ul-Haq, 86-87, Bangladeshi Army officer and minister.
Jean Pickering, 83, English Olympic athlete.
Jean-Marc Roberts, 58, French editor, novelist, and screenwriter, cancer.
Lou Sleater, 86, American baseball player (Baltimore Orioles), lung disease.
Jack Wiley, 92, American football player (Pittsburgh Steelers).

26
Margie Alexander, 64, American R&B and soul singer.
Eddie Basha, Jr., 75, American grocery businessman (Bashas').
Deepak Bharadwaj, 63, Indian politician, shot.
Tom Boerwinkle, 67, American basketball player (Chicago Bulls), myelodysplastic syndrome.
Sir Michael Gow, 88, British Army general.
Juan García Díaz, 72, Spanish footballer (Córdoba CF), complications following a stroke.
Gillian Howie, 47, British philosopher, cancer.
Krzysztof Kozłowski, 81, Polish journalist, Minister of the Interior and Administration (1990–1991), heart failure.
Martyl Langsdorf, 96, American visual artist, designer of the Doomsday Clock, lung infection.
Dave Leggett, 79, American football player (Chicago Cardinals), MVP of the 1955 Rose Bowl.
Claudio Lippi, 42, Italian sports journalist, traffic collision.
Giancarlo Martini, 65, Italian Formula One driver, co-founder and co-owner of Team Minardi.
Patricia McCormick, 83, American bullfighter.
Audrey McElmury, 70, American racing cyclist, female UCI Road World champion (1969).
Nikola Mladenov, 49, Macedonian journalist, traffic collision.
Jerzy Nowak, 89, Polish actor (Schindler's List).
Danilo Orozco, 68, Cuban musicologist.
Don Payne, 48, American television writer (The Simpsons) and screenwriter (Thor, My Super Ex-Girlfriend), bone cancer.
René Pirolley, 81, French Olympic swimmer.
Yury Rudov, 82, Soviet Olympic fencer.
Nikolai Sorokin, 61, Russian actor and director.
Sukumari, 72, Indian actress, complications from burn injury.
Archie Thompson, 93, American Yurok native elder.
Bill Walsh, 90, Irish hurler (Kilkenny GAA).
Jerzy Wyrobek, 63, Polish footballer.

27
Hjalmar Andersen, 90, Norwegian triple Olympic champion (1952) speed skater, trauma due to a fall.
Yvonne Brill, 88, Canadian aerospace engineer (NASA), National Medal of Technology and Innovation (2011), complications from breast cancer.
Keith Burch, 81, British Army major general.
Gerald Curran, 74, American politician, member of the Maryland House of Delegates (1967–1998), pancreatic cancer.
Alfredo De Gasperis, 79, Italian-born Canadian businessman, founder of ConDrain.
Orozimbo Fuenzalida, 87, Chilean Roman Catholic prelate, Bishop of San Bernardo (1987–2003).
Niraj Jain, 86, Indian Jain religious leader.
Roosevelt Jamison, 76, American songwriter ("That's How Strong My Love Is").
Fay Kanin, 95, American screenwriter, playwright and producer (Teacher's Pet, Friendly Fire), President of AMPAS (1979–1983).
*Guillermo Luksic Craig, 57, Chilean businessman (Antofagasta Plc), lung cancer.
P. K. S. Raja, 100, Indian royal, Zamorin of Calicut.
Katharine Stewart, 98, English author, crofter, teacher and postmistress.
Paul Williams, 64, American music journalist, publisher (Crawdaddy!), and writer (Bob Dylan, Performing Artist), complications from Alzheimer's disease.
Will Zens, 92, American filmmaker.

28
Gabriel M. Ambrosio, 74, American politician, member of the New Jersey Senate, cancer (1987–1992).
Jean-Paul Bonnaire, 69, French actor.
George E. P. Box, 93, British statistician.
Odis Echols, 82, American politician, member of the New Mexico Senate (1967–1976), dementia.
Manuel García Ferré, 83, Spanish-born Argentine cartoonist, complications of heart surgery.
John Findlater, 86, Scottish meteorologist.
Jerald G. Fishman, 67, American technology executive, CEO of Analog Devices (since 1996), heart attack.
Jean Floud, 97, British educational sociologist, Principal of Newnham College, Cambridge (1972–1983).
Richard Griffiths, 65, British actor (Withnail and I, The History Boys, Harry Potter), Tony winner (2006), complications from heart surgery.
Dale Hyatt, 87, American businessman.
Soraya Jiménez, 35, Mexican Olympic champion (2000) weightlifter, heart attack.
Hemed Khamis, 62, Tanzanian politician, stroke.
László Klauz, 46, Hungarian Olympic wrestler.
Hugh McCracken, 70, American rock and roll session musician, producer and arranger, leukemia.
Heinz Patzig, 83, German football player and manager (Eintracht Braunschweig).
Yuri Radonyak, 77, Soviet Olympic boxer.
Robert V. Remini, 91, American historian and academic, Historian of the United States House of Representatives (2005–2010), stroke.
Wolfgang Schulz, 67, Austrian concert flutist and university lecturer.
Shi Zongyuan, 66, Chinese politician.
Boris Strel, 53, Slovenian champion skier, suicide.
Bob Teague, 84, American college football player and television journalist, T-cell lymphoma.
Gus Triandos, 82, American baseball player (Baltimore Orioles), heart failure.
John Charles Upton, Jr., 56, American documentary film maker, shot.
Robert Zildjian, 89, American musical instrument manufacturer (Sabian), cancer.

29
Joseph W. Alton, 94, American politician, member of the Maryland Senate (1963–1965).
Lawrence Auster, 64, American traditionalist conservative author and blogger, pancreatic cancer.
Anton Bühler, 90, Swiss Olympic equestrian.
Cheryl Chow, 66, American politician, brain cancer.
Linda S. Cordell, 70, American archaeologist and anthropologist.
Mike DeCicco, 85, American fencing coach (University of Notre Dame), coached five teams to national championships, heart failure.
Barrie Dobson, 81, British historian.
Reid Flair, 25, American professional wrestler, heroin overdose.
Warren Freer, 92, New Zealand politician, MP for Mt. Albert (1947–1981).
Reginald Gray, 82, Irish painter, stomach cancer.
John J. Gumperz, 91, American linguist and academic.
Sheila Holzworth, 51-52, American para-alpine skier, cancer.
István Hont, 65, Hungarian-born British historian.
Brian Huggins, 81, British-born Canadian journalist and actor (Trailer Park Boys).
Enzo Jannacci, 77, Italian singer-songwriter, actor and stand-up comedian, cancer.
Ralph Klein, 70, Canadian politician, Premier of Alberta (1992–2006), MLA for Calgary-Elbow (1989–2007), Mayor of Calgary (1980–1989), COPD and dementia.
Liu Kang, 52, Chinese football player and coach, lung cancer.
William P. Levine, 97, United States Army officer.
Art Malone, 76, American drag racer, Indy car driver, and dragstrip owner, injuries sustained in an airboat collision.
Betty Marshall, 94, American politician, first female Mayor of York, Pennsylvania (1978–1982).
Luis Martínez Noval, 64, Spanish politician, Minister of Labor (1990–1993), complications from a fall.
David McMeeking, 75, South African cricketer.
Jim Mees, 57, American Emmy-winning set designer (Star Trek: The Next Generation, Perfect Strangers), pancreatic cancer.
Art Phillips, 82, Canadian politician, MP for Vancouver Centre (1979–1980), Mayor of Vancouver (1973–1977).
Ernesto Rubin de Cervin, 76, Italian composer and teacher.

30
Brian Ackland-Snow, 72, British production designer (A Room with a View, The Dark Crystal, Death on the Nile), Oscar winner (1986).
Franco Califano, 74, Italian lyricist, musician, singer and actor, heart attack.
Sucharitha Gamlath, 79, Sri Lankan academic.
Eric Hertz, 58, American telecommunications executive, CEO of 2degrees (since 2009), plane crash.
Daniel Hoffman, 89, American poet, United States Poet Laureate (1973–1974).
Peter Kormos, 60, Canadian politician, Ontario MPP for Welland (1988–1999, 2007–2011) and Niagara Centre (1999–2007).
Francisco Javier López Peña, 55, Spanish Basque separatist leader (ETA), heart attack.
Mal Moore, 73, American college football player and coach, University of Alabama athletic director (1999–2013), pulmonary failure.
Samueli Naulu, 31, Fijian rugby union player, traffic collision.
Bobby Parks, 51, American basketball player and coach (Shell Turbo Chargers, University of Memphis), PBA Hall of Fame (2009), laryngeal cancer.
Phil Ramone, 79, South African-born American record producer, aortic aneurysm.
Edith Schaeffer, 98, American Christian leader and author.
Bob Turley, 82, American baseball player (Baltimore Orioles, New York Yankees), World Series MVP (1958), liver cancer.
Valeri Zolotukhin, 71, Russian actor (Bumbarash), brain tumor.

31
Rod Berry, 65, American politician, member of the West Virginia House of Delegates (1987–1991).
Charles Amarin Brand, 92, French Roman Catholic prelate, Archbishop of Monaco (1981–1984) and Strasbourg (1984–1997).
Ernie Bridge, 76, Australian politician, member of the Western Australian Legislative Assembly for Kimberley (1980–2001), mesothelioma.
W. E. Butts, 68, American poet, Poet Laureate of New Hampshire.
Helena Carroll, 84, Scottish actress (Rocky V, The Jerk). 
Bob Clarke, 87, American illustrator (Mad magazine), complications of pneumonia.
Henry Clarke, 79, American businessman and venture capitalist, developed the Klondike bar.
Ray Drake, 78, English footballer (Stockport County).
Dick Duden, 88, American football player (New York Giants) and coach (United States Naval Academy).
Courtney Gonsalves, 62, Guyanese cricketer.
Ahmad Sayyed Javadi, 95, Iranian political activist and politician, Minister of Justice (1979), Minister of Interior (1979).
Sir Michael Jenkins, 77, British diplomat, Ambassador to the Netherlands (1988–1993).
Bebe Lee, 96, American basketball coach and administrator.
Mack McInnis, 79, American politician, member of the Mississippi House of Representatives (1976–1980, 1992–2000).
Gerlof Mees, 86, Dutch ichthyologist and ornithologist.
Pattycake, 40, western lowland gorilla, heart disease.
Ronnie Ray Smith, 64, American Olympic champion (1968) sprinter.
Dmitri Uchaykin, 32, Russian ice hockey player (HC Ertis-Pavlodar), cerebral hemorrhage.

References

2013-03
 03